Filosofská historie is a 1937 Czechoslovak drama film directed by Otakar Vávra.

Cast
 Ladislav Boháč as Vavrena
 Karla Olicová as Lenka
 Jan Pivec as Frybort
 Elena Hálková as Marinka
 Vladimír Hlavatý as Spina
 Stanislav Neumann as Zelenka
 Helena Friedlová as Miss Elis, landlady
 Ela Poznerová as Lotty Roubínková (as Ella Poznerová)
 Zdenka Grafová as Therese Roubinkova
 Jindřich Plachta as Mayor Roubinek

References

External links
 

1937 films
1937 drama films
1930s Czech-language films
Czechoslovak black-and-white films
Films based on works by Alois Jirásek
Films directed by Otakar Vávra
Czechoslovak drama films
1930s Czech films